Ken Lockwood Gorge is between Califon and High Bridge in Lebanon Township of Hunterdon County, New Jersey. It was purchased in 1948 by the Division of Fish, Game and Wildlife and has been referred to as “one of New Jersey's most beautiful places.” It is presently administered by the New Jersey Division of Fish and Wildlife.

The 2½-mile (4 km) stretch of the South Branch Raritan River comprises the central feature of this  Wildlife Management Area. Steep, hilly woodlands host a plethora of flora and fauna including both game and non-game varieties, including a diverse population of birds and mammals.

Ken Lockwood Gorge is best known as a trout fishing destination.  The New Jersey Division of Fish & Wildlife has designated the area as a "Trout Conservation Area", in which a separate set of rules apply.  The limits are different from most other sections of the Raritan River, and fishing with bait is prohibited.

The gorge is named after Kenneth F. Lockwood, an outdoor journalist and conservationist.  Ken Lockwood was best known for his column, "Out In The Open", which ran in the now-defunct Newark Evening News.  He was also a strong advocate for land conservation, promoting setting aside land for hunting and fishing.  Ken Lockwood died on April 2, 1948 on the way home from his weekly radio program.  Ken Lockwood Gorge was named after him a short time later.

The Columbia Trail passes through the gorge and crosses the river on the Ken Lockwood Gorge Bridge.

See also
 List of New Jersey wildlife management areas

References

External links
 
 
Photo Gallery
KLG Fly fishing photography

Lebanon Township, New Jersey
Protected areas of Hunterdon County, New Jersey
Canyons and gorges of New Jersey
Landforms of Hunterdon County, New Jersey
Wildlife management areas of New Jersey